The 2023 Orlando Guardians season is the second season for the Orlando Guardians as a professional American football franchise. They are charter members of the XFL, one of eight teams to compete in the league for the 2023 season. The Guardians will play their home games at the Camping World Stadium and be led led by head coach Terrell Buckley.

The Guardians had changed their franchise name from New York Guardians to the Orlando Guardians prior to the 2023 season. The franchise also relocated the team from East Rutherford, New Jersey to Orlando, Florida.

Roster changes
After week 2 the Guardians cut quarterback Quinten Dormady who was allegedly involved with giving the team's playbook to Brahmas player. The XFL has reinstated him a day after, and it was later reveled that the accusations were false. Nonetheless, he was later replaced by Quinton Flowers.

Schedule
All times Eastern

Game Summaries

Week 1: at Houston Roughnecks

Week 2: vs. San Antonio Brahmas

Week 3: at Arlington Renegades

Week 4: vs. Houston Roughnecks

Week 5: at Vegas Vipers

Week 6: vs. Seattle Sea Dragons

Standings

Staff

Roster

References

Orlando
Orlando Guardians
Orlando Guardians